(born 1952) is a Japanese astronomer at Gekko Observatory and prolific discoverer of 61 asteroids as credited by the Minor Planet Center, and include the binary asteroid 4383 Suruga, the potentially hazardous object (7753) 1988 XB and the Jupiter trojan 4715 Medesicaste.

International asteroid monitoring project 

Japan Spaceguard Association (JSGA) is keen to have astronomical education for young people and held Spaceguard Private Investigator of the Stars— the fugitives are asteroids! program in 2001. Yoshiaki Oshima participated as one of the committee member. JSGA submitted a paper on that project in a proceedings, with Oshima as a contributor.

JSGA held an astronomical education program as part of their International Asteroid Monitoring Project, that collaborated with the British Council and its International Schools' Observatory (ISO) program which had involved 12 teams of junior high to senior high school classes from Asian and European countries.

The Private Investigator of Stars was co-sponsored by the British Council which advised the International Asteroid Monitoring Project by coordinating observatory in the Canary islands and participating laboratories for ISO. Yomiuri Shinbun newspaper held an asteroid hunting contest for the JSGA and run articles on their pages. 438 school classes and other teams signed up with 1,317 indibivisuals, and 133 teams reported the results of their observation.

JSGA based its project headquarters in its observatory called Bisei Spaceguard Center, owned by the Japan Space Forum. An optical telescope on the Canary island has been operated by the staff of Astrophysics Research Institute at John Moore University in Liverpool, and images were transmitted to each classroom via internet connection.

Honors 

The outer main-belt asteroid 5592 Oshima is named after him. The naming citation also mentions his contribution to the development of the instrumentation at the Nihondaira Observatory.

List of discovered minor planets 

In 1988, Oshima discovered (7753) 1988 XB, a near-Earth object and potentially hazardous asteroid that approaches the orbit of Earth as close as 2.5 lunar distances. He also discovered 4715 Medesicaste, a 64-kilometer sized Jupiter trojan in 1989. By the end of the same year, he discovered 4383 Suruga a binary with a minor-planet moon. All discoveries he made at the Gekko Observatory (see table below).

Works 
 Isobe, S., Atsuo, A., Asher, D., Fuse, T., Hashimoto, N., Nakano, S., K. Nishiyama, Yoshiaki Oshima, Noritsugu Takahashi, J. Terazono, H. Umehara, Takeshi Urata, Makoto Yoshikawa. "Educational program of Japan Spaceguard Association using asteroid search", Spaceguard Detective Agency, Proceedings of Asteroids, Comets, Meteors – ACM  2002. International Conference, 29 July – 2 August 2002

See also

Notes

References 
 

1952 births
Discoverers of asteroids

20th-century Japanese astronomers
Living people